Andrew James William Copson, FRSA, FCMI, MCIPR (born 19 November 1980) is a Humanist leader and writer. He is the Chief Executive of Humanists UK and the President of Humanists International.

He has worked for a number of civil and human rights organisations throughout his career in his capacity as executive committee member, director or trustee and has represented Humanist organisations before the House of Commons, the Organization for Security and Co-operation in Europe and the United Nations. As a prominent spokesperson for the Humanist movement in the United Kingdom he is a frequent contributor to newspaper articles, news items, television and radio programmes and regularly speaks to Humanist and secular groups throughout Britain.

Copson has contributed to several books on secularism and humanism and is the author of Secularism: Politics, Religion, and Freedom.

Early life 
Copson was born on 19 November 1980 in Nuneaton, Warwickshire, to David Copson and Julia Heather Cunningham. He was educated at the private school King Henry VIII School, Coventry which he describes as secular in its outlook. From a working-class background, he went to the school as part of the government Assisted Places Scheme. He was brought up entirely without religion; as well as having non-religious parents, neither his grandparents nor his great-grandparents were religious and never had been. At secondary school, he first encountered Christianity, but rejected it when he did not see any truth in it.

He attended Balliol College, University of Oxford, graduating with a first class Bachelor of Arts degree in Ancient and Modern History in 2004. He first joined the British Humanist Association in 2002 while at university: his mother had already been a member for some time. This was in response to a campaign the BHA was running at the time against the increase in the number of state schools run by religious organisations, or creationist academies. He began volunteering for both the British Humanist Association and the Citizenship Foundation, an organisation which aims to address democratic inequality on social, moral and political issues, after graduating from Oxford.

Positions 
In 2005 Copson started working at Humanists UK, known at the time as the British Humanist Association (BHA) as director of education and public affairs. In December of the same year he won an award at the 2005 UK Young Education Programme, an organisation which promotes communication skills and rewards open debate on issues affecting society. In his role at the BHA he was responsible for campaigning for a secular state and promoting awareness of Humanism in schools and colleges and to the wider public.

In 2010 he became Humanists UK's youngest ever Chief Executive at the age of 29, having been appointed to the Board of Trustees the previous November; a position which he described at the time as "obviously a daunting one", saying that he felt "a huge responsibility to build on the BHA's many successes."

He is a former director of the European Humanist Federation and has acted as representative of Humanist organisations to the United Nations, the Foreign and Commonwealth Office and the Organization for Security and Co-operation in Europe.

In 2015, Copson was elected as President of the International Humanist and Ethical Union, taking over from the award-winning Belgian Humanist Sonja Eggerickx.

As of 2018, Copson is a trustee of the following organisations:
 The Actors of Dionysus
 International Humanist Trust
 Electoral Reform Society
 Religious Education Council of England and Wales (Treasurer)

In the past, he has been on the executive committees of the Labour Humanists, Religious Education Council of England and Wales, Oxford Pride, was chair of the Gay and Lesbian Humanist Association and has been a trustee of many organisations including All Faiths and None, the National Council for Faiths and Beliefs in Further Education, European Humanist Federation, Conway Hall Ethical Society (stepping down at the AGM on 10 November 2013) and the Values Education Council.

He is also a fellow of the Chartered Management Institute and the Royal Society of Arts and a member of the Chartered Institute of Public Relations, European Humanist Professionals and the Association of Chief Executives of Voluntary Organisations.

Copson also finds time for regular public speaking on a wide range of Humanist topics in the United Kingdom and abroad.

Books 
Copson has written, edited and contributed to several books on secularism and humanism including:

As author or editor:
 The Wiley Blackwell Handbook of Humanism (2015), editor with A. C. Grayling.
 Secularism: Politics, Religion, and Freedom (2017), author.
 Secularism: a very short introduction (2019), author.
 The Little Book of Humanism (2020), author with Alice Roberts
 The Little Book of Humanist Weddings (2021), author with Alice Roberts

As contributor:
 Debating Humanism (2006), contributor, edited by Dolan Cummings.
 The Atheist's Guide to Christmas (2009), contributor, edited by Ariane Sherine.
 Everyday Humanism (2014), contributor, edited by Dale McGowan and Anthony B. Pinn.
 A Better Life: 100 Atheists Speak Out on Joy & Meaning in a World Without God (2014), contributor, edited/photography by Chris Johnson.
 Filling the Void: A Selection of Humanist and Atheist Poetry (2016), contributor, edited by Jonathan M.S. Pearce.

Views 

Copson is a regular contributor to New Humanist magazine, has written for The Guardian, New Statesman, The Times and The Independent, and has been interviewed on BBC News, ITV, Channel 4 and Sky for non-religious opinions on topics such as religious symbols in the workplace and euthanasia. He was one of the editors of The Wiley Blackwell Handbook of Humanism, a collection of essays that explore Humanism as the way of life. He also contributed a foreword to Filling the Void: A Selection of Humanist and Atheist Poetry, edited by Jonathan M.S. Pearce in 2016, and contributed to The Case for Secularism: A neutral state in an open society, a collection of essays from the Humanist Philosophers Group in 2014.

When asked whether his attitude to Humanism included scientific skepticism he said: "A Humanist is someone who puts human welfare and the welfare of other sentient beings at the centre of their morality. Humanism is characterised by skepticism and the scientific method."

Copson has also spoken widely on the subject of secularism, the separation of religion from the state, particularly in regard to children's education, civil ceremonies such as marriages and funerals, Human Rights law, against the automatic right of unelected Anglican bishops to sit in the House of Lords and the provision of religious chaplains in institutions such as the prison system and hospitals and hospices. He states his opinion as freedom of belief, that people should be free to believe whichever religion they choose and the law should not discriminate against a person because of those beliefs. 

Along with biologist and author Richard Dawkins, Copson has questioned the need for "atheist churches", an idea posited by Alain de Botton in response to a Humanist debate over the idea of creating an atheist temple, and has expressed doubt in regards to future success of The Sunday Assembly. He has also spoken frequently in regard to state education in England and the provision of non-religious schools and evidence-based teaching, both in his capacity as Chief Executive of the BHA and as a lifelong Humanist. Copson commented:   He considers collective worship and the teaching of religion in schools "one of the biggest education debates of our time."

Copson has also spoken publicly about the murders in Bangladesh of atheist bloggers Washiqur Rahman, Avijit Roy and the attack on his wife Rafida Ahmed, and Ananta Bijoy Das, calling on the Bangladeshi government to "do more to protect all its citizens from brutal fundamentalist thugs who would kill another human being for daring to think outside the confines of dogmatic religion."

He has also criticised the attempts of Nicolas Sarkozy in France to ban the burkini from French public beaches on the grounds that it disproportionately attacks women, demonises Muslim women specifically and is incompatible with religious freedom of choice.

On the subject of his own non-religious beliefs, Copson has expressed unease with the way Humanism is often defined negatively by what one does not believe in, for example a lack of belief in god or gods and in 2016 said:

Personal life 
In 2011, Copson entered into a civil partnership with Mark Wardrop.

See also 

Atheism
Civil and political rights
Freethought
Humanism
Human rights
Rationalism
Skepticism

References

External links 

Living people
English humanists
English atheists
Alumni of Balliol College, Oxford
Gay men
People educated at King Henry VIII School, Coventry
People from Nuneaton
1980 births
English LGBT people
British secularists
21st-century LGBT people